Aaron Cook may refer to:

Aaron Cook (baseball) (born 1979), Major League Baseball pitcher
Aaron Cook (footballer) (born 1979), Welsh footballer
Aaron Cook (taekwondo) (born 1991), British born Moldovan taekwondo athlete
Aaron Cook Jr. (born 1997), American basketball player